Mamenchisaurus (Dinosauria Translation and Pronunciation Guide M or spelling pronunciation ) is a genus of sauropod dinosaur known for their remarkably long necks which made up nearly half the total body length. Numerous species have been assigned to the genus; however, many of these might be questionable. Fossils have been found in the Sichuan Basin and Yunnan Province in China. Several species are from the Upper Shaximiao Formation whose geologic age is uncertain. However, evidence suggests that this be no earlier than the Oxfordian stage of the Late Jurassic. M. sinocanadorum dates to the Oxfordian stage (158.7 to 161.2 mya) and M. anyuensis to the Aptian stage of the Early Cretaceous around 114.4 mya.

History and species
Mamenchisaurus was first discovered in 1952 on the construction site of the Yitang Highway in Sichuan Province of China. The fossil site belonged to the Upper Shaximiao Formation, dating to at least the Late Jurassic. The partial skeleton fossil was later studied and named Mamenchisaurus constructus in 1954 by the renowned Chinese paleontologist Professor C. C. Young.

The type specimen (IVPP V. 790) was fragmentary, disordered, and not excavated in a technical way. Material included five dorsal vertebrae, 30 caudal vertebrae, rib fragments, dorsal neural spines, and chevrons. Fourteen neck vertebrae were preserved, but none were complete. Young noted that some neck vertebrae might have been missing. Limb material included; two pieces of a femur, a complete tibia, fibula, astragalus, metatarsals, phalanges, and claws. The skull, forelimbs, and pelvic girdle were missing. 

Mamenchisaurus means 'Mamenchi lizard', from the Chinese Pinyin mǎ (马 'horse') and mén (门 'gate'), while chi is a transliteration of xī (溪 'stream' or 'brook'), combined with the suffix -saurus (from Greek sauros meaning 'lizard'). The intention was to name the genus after the place where its fossil was first found. However, due to an accentual mix-up by Young, the location name Mǎmíngxī (马鸣溪 'horse-neighing brook') was mistaken as Mǎménxī (马门溪 'horse-gate brook'). The fact that the first Mamenchisaurus fossil was found due to construction work led to Young's naming the type species as Mamenchisaurus constructus.

In 1958, Young described additional sauropod remains collected from Gansu Province. The remains consisted of various partial specimens (IVPP V. 945, V. 946, V. 947, V. 948) most of which were assigned to M. constructus. In 1972, one of these specimens was reassigned to M. hochuanensis.

Mamenchisaurus hochuanensis 

In 1972, Young and Xijin Zhao described a second species, Mamenchisaurus hochuanensis. The M. hochuanensis fossil site also belonged to the Upper Shaximiao Formation, very close to the M. constructus type specimen's location, dating to at least the Late Jurassic. Locals first discovered the remains sometime before the Chinese Revolution. However, the remains were ultimately abandoned and left to weather in situ. Excavation did not begin on the site until 1957.

The holotype specimen (CCG V 20401) consisted of an almost complete and articulated vertebral column; including 19 elongated cervical vertebrae, which were almost entirely preserved, 12 dorsal vertebrae, four sacral vertebrae, and 35 caudal vertebrae with only the last several missing. Also missing from the skeleton was the majority of the forelimbs and skull. When M. hochuanensis was first described, it was the largest sauropod known from China.

In 1958, Young described a mamenchisaur specimen (IVPP V. 946) from the Haishiwan region of Yongdeng, Gansu Province. This specimen was initially assigned to M. constructus. However, in 1972 it was reassigned to M. hochuanensis as a paratype. This specimen was slightly smaller than the holotype and consisted of less material overall. However, it contained some anatomical details missing in the type specimen.

In 2001, another specimen (ZDM0126) was described and referred to M. hochuanensis. It was found in 1995 at a construction site in Huidong New District, Zigong City, Sichuan Province. This specimen was nearly complete and mostly articulated, preserving features missing from the holotype, such as the skull, pectoral girdle and forelimb material. However, a 2020 phylogenetic analysis by Moore and colleagues cast doubt on the referral of this specimen to M. hochuanensis.

Mamenchisaurus sinocanadorum 

In August 1987, a cervical rib was seen projecting out of a cliff by Z-M. Dong on an expedition by the China-Canada Dinosaur Project. The fossil site was located in the Junggar Basin, Xinjiang; from the upper part of the Shishugou Formation, making it one of the few mamenchisaurs known from outside the Sichuan basin; the locality is thought to date to around 162.2 million years ago. However, the original authors reported incorrect coordinates for the quarry that were later corrected by a subsequent study. The coarse and weak sandstone the specimen was preserved in, alongside the large and fragile nature of the bones, impeded excavation, leading to only the most anterior vertebrae being recovered despite more neck material being present. The specimen was named as a new species of Mamenchisaurus, coined M. sinocanadorum, in 1993 by Dale Russell and Zhong Zheng. The specific name refers to the China-Canada Dinosaur Project. 

The neural arches of the vertebrae were well fused to the centra suggesting that the animal was mature. The authors noted that the teeth are fully erupted but unworn, possibly suggesting the animal starved. Due to the limited amount of bone at the cliff base, the authors proposed that the cervical vertebrae broke away before full decomposition. The head and part of the neck then drifted downstream until they came to rest in shallow water on a point bar and eventually buried. In 2023, M. sinocanadorum was redescribed by Andrew Moore and colleagues. The authors could not locate the vomer, right pterygoid, the possible ectopterygoid, the right quadrate, and the right dentary for restudy. A phylogenetic analysis performed by the authors found it to be outside the clade of other Mamenchisaurus species, closely allied to Xinjiangtitan, but refrained from taxonomic action until the type species M. constructus received re-evaluation.

Two large cervical vertebrae found from the same formation as M. sinocanadorum were informally referred to the species by Gregory S. Paul in 2019 based on their large sizes and origin. However, these vertebrae have yet to be formally described. Paul has suggested these may represent one of the largest dinosaurs known. Moore and colleagues could not support the referral of these vertebrae to M. sinocanadorum in their redescription of the species because the vertebrae lack anatomical overlap with the known material of the type specimen, and so cannot be compared for diagnosis. They also noted an undescribed specimen on display at the China University of the Geosciences in Beijing labelled as belonging to the species which has not been evaluated firsthand or mentioned in the scientific literature. Accordingly, they consider the referral to the species premature.

Mamenchisaurus anyuensis 
M. anyuensis was described in 1996 by Xinlu He and colleagues. The remains were discovered in 1987 from two locations near the town of Longchiaoxiang in the Sichuan Basin. At one quarry, at least five to six individuals were found. At a second quarry, four individuals were found. One of these became the holotype, AL001, representing two-thirds of an articulated skeleton. Other specimens were also reported, AL002, AL003, and AL101-106, which provide more skeletal information. The species name references Anyue County where it was discovered. M. anyuensis is known from both the top of the Suining Formation and the bottom of the Penglaizhen Formation. Uranium–lead dating places M. anyuensis in the Suining Formation at 114.4 Ma in age; as this would make it roughly 30 million years younger than the other Mamenchisaurus species, it is unlikely that M. anyuensis is actually a member of the genus.

The holotype specimen preserved eight posterior cervical vertebrae, twelve dorsal vertebrae, five sacral vertebrae, several caudal vertebrae, and a complete pelvis. Another specimen (AL102) preserved five articulated cervical vertebrae from the middle of the neck. Except for the digit bones, the forelimb is completely known and represented by multiple individuals.

Mamenchisaurus youngi 
Also described in 1996 was Mamenchisaurus youngi from the Upper Shaximiao Formation. A local quarrying stone near a village in Zigong, Sichuan Province, found the remains in 1987. The species was named in honour of C. C. Young.

The holotype specimen (ZDM 0083) was very complete and mostly articulated, preserving all the vertebrae from the head down to the 8th tail vertebra. Also preserved were the pectoral girdle, pelvic girdle, and material from all four limbs. This specimen also preserved a nearly complete skull.

Mamenchisaurus jingyanensis 
M. jingyanensis was described in 1998 by Yihong Zhang, Kui Li, and Qinghua Zeng. A third specimen (CV00219) found near the village of Dujia, about 10 kilometers from Sanjiang. The fossils were located in the Sichuan basin, from the Upper Shaximiao Formation. The species name refers to Jingyan County from which the majority of specimens were excavated.

The type specimen includes a partial scapula and complete coracoid, forelimb material, a complete ischium, a relatively complete skull, and a hyoid bone. The paratype specimen included three anterior cervical vertebrae, several weathered dorsal vertebrae, various caudal vertebrae including a nearly articulated column, relatively complete hind and forelimbs, and isolated teeth. The third specimen preserved a column of cervical vertebrae with articulated ribs, four fused sacral vertebrae, several caudal vertebrae, a complete scapulocoracoid, various limb bones, and isolated teeth.

Other Mamenchisaurus species and material 
Other species of Mamenchisaurus have been named over the years. In some cases, species from other genera have been transferred to Mamenchisaurus, but there is disagreement with the referral's validity. Some of these species are based on fragmentary remains and have been considered undiagnostic. Others are considered as invalid or as nomina nuda.

In 1976, Hou, Chao and Chu named a new genus, Zigongosaurus fuxiensis. Known from at least four specimens from the Upper Shaximiao Formation. The type specimen (CV 02501) included skull material; maxilla, dentary, and basioccipital. Additional material includes dorsal vertebrae, pubis, and ischium. Since Zigongosaurus was described, other researchers have disagreed on whether the genus is valid. In 1983, Dong, Zhou and Zhang assigned some of the remains to the similarly named Omeisaurus fuxiensis, and the rest to Omeisaurus junghsiensis.  Zhang and Chen assigned the remains to Mamenchisaurus as M. fuxiensis in 1996. Li and Cai considered it a nomen nudum in 1997. In 1999, Valérie Martin-Rolland considered Zigongosaurus a valid genus. Wang and colleagues considered it undiagnostic in 2019.

Another species, "Mamenchisaurus guangyuanensis", has not been formally described, making it a nomen nudum. It is known from the remains of several individuals, ranging from juvenile to adult, from the Upper Shaximiao Formation. The largest individuals were estimated to have a length of  It was originally described by Zhang Suping in her 1981 thesis as "Omeisaurus guangyuanensis", but in 1997, Li and Cai listed it as a species of Mamenchisaurus. Like Mamenchisaurus, but unlike Omeisaurus, it shows bifurcated neural spines and procoelous caudal vertebrae. It was considered non-diagnostic by Wang and colleagues in 2019.

M. yunnanensis was described by Fang and colleagues in 2004, from the Anning Formation in the Sichuan Basin, Yunnan. The type specimen consisted of disarticulated forelimb, hindlimb, and pelvic material. Wang and colleagues questioned the assignment to Mamenchisaurus in 2019.

In 1988, He and colleagues considered Omeisaurus changshouensis to be closer to Mamenchisaurus based on features of the caudal vertebrae. In 2019, Tan and colleagues agreed with this assessment. In 1996, Zhang and Chen considered Omeisaurus changshouensis and Omeisaurus gongjianensis as referrable to Mamenchisaurus. However, in 2004, Upchurch considered O. changshouensis undiagnosable.

In 1978, an incomplete sauropod humerus (NSM PV17656) found in a layer of the Early Cretaceous-aged Miyako Group of Japan was considered to probably belong to Mamenchisaurus. In 1991, it was referred to ?Mamenchisaurus sp. by Hasegawa and colleagues. However, the humerus was reassessed by Azuma & Tomida in 1998, and Barrett and colleagues in 2002. These authors could not find any distinguishing features that could place the humerus into a specific sauropod group. They regarded it as an indeterminate sauropod. The remains were given an informal name "Moshi-ryu"; "Moshi" being the local name for the location it was discovered, and "ryu" being Japanise for dragon—also referred to as "Moshisaurus".

Description 
There is uncertainty that all the species assigned to Mamenchisaurus should belong to the genus. Some Mamenchisaurus species are almost completely known, and others are fragmentary. The species differ in overall size and specific features of the skull and skeleton but share typical sauropod traits, like quadrupedalism, large bodies, small heads, and long tails. The most distinctive feature of mamenchisaurids is their exceptionally long necks which approach half their total length. Complete necks are known in M. youngi and M. hochuanensis, which consist of 18 and 19 vertebrae, respectively. Mamenchisaurus cervical vertebrae are elongated, lightly constructed and highly pneumatic. The neural spines on their posterior cervical and anterior dorsal vertebrae are bifurcated. Their shoulders were somewhat higher than the hips.

In 1972, Young and Chao described M. hochuanensis as having 19 cervical and 12 dorsal vertebrae. However, Paul Upchurch and colleagues suggested this vertebral count may be incorrect. The authors noted that the vertebra that is usually referred to as the second dorsal possessed a hyposphene, a feature not usually seen until the third or fourth dorsal in sauropods. They provisionally proposed that the actual vertebral count might be 18 cervicals and 13 dorsals in M. hochuanensis. 

M. sinocanadorum is known from fragmentary remains, but these suggest that it was a large species. For comparison, a Sauroposeidon cervical rib measures . Based on CT imaging, Moore and colleagues estimated the cervical vertebrae of M.sinocandorum to be 69–77% air by volume, assuming complete removal of bone marrow. In contrast to the more squared-off jaws of diplodocids, the front of the mandibles met at an oblique angle. Two as-yet-undescribed cervical vertebrae possibly suggest one of the largest dinosaurs known. Gregory S. Paul suggested that these might belong to M. sinocanadorum and estimated a length  and possibly weighing . However, the referral of these vertebrae to M. sinocanadorum has been questioned.

M. anyuensis shares morphological similarities to M. hochuanensis.

M. youngi is one of the smaller species of Mamenchisaurus and known from relatively complete remains. The mass of M. youngi was estimated at  using volumetric techniques. The holotype specimen preserves a nearly complete skull. There were four teeth in the premaxilla, 18 in the maxilla, and 22 to 24 in the dentary. An unusual part of the skeleton is the wedge-shaped sacrum; this causes the sacrum and the base of the tail to pitch up relative to the rest of the vertebral column.

There were four teeth in the premaxilla, 14–16 in the maxilla, and 17–19 in the dentary.

Mamenchisaurus have forked chevrons (or sled chevrons) starting around the middle of the tail, similar to those seen in diplodocids; these chevrons curve strongly backwards and add a forward projection. Paul has argued that these types of chevrons are adaptations linked to rearing behaviour. In a tripodal stance, the tail acts as a prop, and the forked chevrons would help distribute the weight evenly. Paul also notes that the pelvises of Mamenchisaurs are retroverted (tilted), which may have allowed slow walking whilst bipedal.

ZDM0126, a specimen possibly referable to M. hochuanensis, possessed four fused caudal vertebrae near the tip of the tail. These vertebrae have expanded neural arches and taller neural spines, possibly representing a tail club. A study by Lida Xing and colleagues performed a finite element analysis on the club. The authors concluded that the club would have a limited ability to perform as a defensive weapon but might have also functioned as a sensory organ. Other Chinese sauropods, Shunosaurus and Omeisaurus, are also known to have had tail clubs, but they differ in shape to that of ZDM0126.

The neck posture and feeding strategies of sauropod dinosaurs is a controversial topic. Andreas Christian and colleagues analysed the neck of M. youngi. They found the neck was nearly straight with a slight upward bend at the base and a slight downward bend towards the head when articulated in a neutral posture. The base of the neck has comparatively high upward flexibility but limited downward flexibility. The region near the head had better downward flexibility and low upward flexibility. In the mid-region, downward flexibility was high, which led the authors to conclude that M. youngi frequently fed at low levels. Long overlapping cervical ribs may have limited flexibility. The authors also estimated the stress on the intervertebral joint cartilage. Their results suggest the neck was kept mostly straight, with the possible exception of the neck base and near the head.

By sectioning the bone and counting the growth rings, the age at death was estimated at 43 years.

Classification 
Mamenchisaurus is sometimes referred to as a 'wastebasket taxon', with researchers questioning the number of species and fragmentary remains assigned to the genus. The genus is poorly defined with an increasingly confused taxonomy which makes understanding phylogenetic relationships difficult. Several analyses have failed to show Mamenchisaurus as monophyletic, suggesting the need to revise the genus. Additional research on the type species, M. constructus, is required to better understand the genus.

When M. constructus was first described, Young noted that the chevron bones indicated an affinity with Diplodocidae, but was uncertain to its exact position. In 1958, Young assigned Mamenchisaurus to the Titanosauridae. With the description of M. hochuanensis, Young and Zhao created the family Mamenchisauridae in 1972. In 1978, when no Mamenchisaurus skulls were known, Berman and McIntosh assigned the genus to diplodocidae based on diplodocid-like vertebral features such as the forked chevrons. In 1990, McIntosh assigned Mamenchisaurus to a subfamily Mamenchisaurinae, which was placed inside Diplodocidae.

An analysis by Upchurch found Mamenchisaurus in the family Euhelopodidae. Euhelopodidae, being named first, would take priority over Mamenchisauridae. Several later analyses found Euhelopus to be a more distantly related macronarian, with Mamenchisaurus in Mamenchisauridae just outside of Neosauropoda.

Sekiya in 2011 and Moore and colleagues in 2020 treated M. constructus, M. hochuanensis, ZDM 0126 (M. hochuanensis referred), M. sinocandadorum, and M. youngi separately in their analyses. Moore and colleagues analyses found the position of M. constructus to be unstable, probably due to the limited character information in its original description. Depending on the dataset used, Euhelopus would either be within Macronaria, as other studies have found or outside Neosauropoda in a more traditional position, grouped with other Mamenchisaurus-like taxa. The latter scenario would make mamenchisaurids members of Euhelopodidae. The analyses of Sekiya (2011) and Moore and colleagues (2020) did not recover ZDM 0126 as a sister taxon to the holotype of M. hochuanensis, questioning its referral to the species.

The cladogram below shows a possible phylogenetic position of the genus within Sauropoda, from Allain and Aquesbi, 2008:

Below, two phylogenetic trees show the internal relationships of Euhelopodidae/Mamenchisauridae in the two analyses Moore and colleagues deemed most favorable, the implied-weights and Bayesian analyses of the Gonzàlez Riga dataset.

Topology A: Implied-weights analysis, Gonzàlez Riga dataset
Topology B: Time-calibrated Bayesian analysis, Gonzàlez Riga dataset

The 2023 redescription of M. sinocanadorum found a consistent sister taxon relationship between it and Xinjiangtitan, with Hudiesaurus and referred material of M. hochuanensis (ZDM 0126) also found to be consistent relatives.

Paleochronology 
Mamenchisaurus was originally thought to have ranged from the Middle to Late Jurassic. However, there is not reliable dating for the Upper Shaximiao Formation, where many of the Mamenchisaurus species are found.

A study published in 2018 used uranium–lead dating on the underlying Omeisaurus bearing beds of the Lower Shaximiao Formation, previously thought to belong to the Middle Jurassic. However, the radiometric dating found the Lower Shaximiao Formation dated to the Late Jurassic, Oxfordian Stage, around 159 million years ago (mya). This finding suggests a younger age for the overlying Mamenchisaurus bearing rocks of the Upper Shaximiao; implying them to be no older than the Oxfordian.

M. sinocanadorum was found from the Middle to Upper Shishugou Formation. Radiometric dating suggests this formation dated to the Oxfordian, ranging from 158.7 to 161.2 mya. M. anyuensis, was found in the Suining Formation, thought initially to be Middle to Late Jurassic. A 2019 study found these rocks belonged to the Early Cretaceous, Aptian Stage, with an average age of around 114.4 mya. This indicates that mamenchisaurids might have existed around 30 million years longer than previously thought.

References

External links 

 Dinosaur.net.cn (in Chinese and English)

Mamenchisaurids
Late Jurassic dinosaurs of Asia
Jurassic China
Early Cretaceous dinosaurs of Asia
Cretaceous China
Fossils of China
Paleontology in Xinjiang
Fossil taxa described in 1954
Taxa named by Yang Zhongjian